The 2022–23 New Taipei CTBC DEA season was the franchise's 2nd season, its second season in the T1 League, its 2nd in New Taipei City. The DEA are coached by Lee Yi-Hua in his second year as head coach. On September 5, 2022, the T1 League named Chang Shu-Jen, the general manager of the New Taipei CTBC DEA, as their new secretary general. And the DEA named Liu Chih-Wei, the general manager of the CTBC Brothers, as their new general manager.

Draft 

 Reference：

The DEA's 2022 first-round draft pick was traded to Kaohsiung Aquas in exchange for cash considerations.

Standings

Roster 

<noinclude>

Game log

2022 Interleague Play

Group match

Quarterfinals

Semifinals

Finals

Preseason

Regular season

Player Statistics 
<noinclude>

Regular season

 Reference：

Transactions

Free agents

Additions

Subtractions

Awards

MVP of the Month

Import of the Month

All-Star Game Awards

References 

2022–23 T1 League season by team
New Taipei CTBC DEA seasons